Sakhteman (also Romanized as Sākhtemān; also known as Shekar Bolāghī-ye Soflá) is a village in Bastam Rural District, in the Central District of Chaypareh County, West Azerbaijan Province, Iran. At the 2006 census, its population was 12, with four families.

References 

Populated places in Chaypareh County